Last Cab to Darwin is a 2015 Australian film directed by Jeremy Sims and written by Sims and Reg Cribb. Based on Cribb's 2003 play of the same name, it stars Michael Caton, Ningali Lawford, Mark Coles Smith, Emma Hamilton, and Jacki Weaver, who was in the original cast of the play. Like the play, the film was inspired by the true story of Max Bell, a taxi driver who traveled from Broken Hill to Darwin to seek euthanasia after he was diagnosed with a terminal illness. The film received positive reviews and was nominated for nine AACTA Awards, winning Best Actor for Caton and Best Adapted Screenplay for Sims and Cribb.

Plot
Rex, a taxi driver in his 70s, has spent nearly his entire life in the New South Wales city of Broken Hill. He has a group of friends, but never had a family of his own and has no family members remaining. He has a close relationship with his Aboriginal neighbor Polly, but because of racial tensions, is resistant to becoming romantically involved. Rex's life changes when he is diagnosed with cancer and told he will not survive longer than three months. Refusing to become committed to a hospital, he learns that a euthanasia device has been invented by Dr. Nicole Farmer at a clinic in the Northern Territory capital city of Darwin. Rex contacts Dr. Farmer and volunteers to serve as the device's first patient. Due to euthanasia only being legal in the Northern Territory, Rex embarks on a 3,000 kilometer journey to Darwin to end his life on his own terms. He leaves behind a will, which grants ownership of his home to Polly.

On the way to Darwin, Rex is joined by Tilly, an Aboriginal drifter. Tilly reveals to Rex that he turned down an offer to join a football club and eventually admits he did so out of fear. The men are later accompanied by Julie, an English backpacker and nurse. When they reach their destination, the group learns from Dr. Farmer that euthanasia cannot legally proceed without approval from a psychological and medical expert. As he waits to be interviewed by the experts, Rex has Tilly join the football club he originally turned down. He also contacts Polly, despite her anger at him for trying to end his life, and admits that he wanted to ask for her hand in marriage. She calls him back and says she would have accepted.

Rex's interview with a medical expert becomes delayed and he winds up becoming hospitalized, which he was attempting to avoid. Unable to wait any longer, Rex has Julie hook him up to the device and answers the questions required to initiate the euthanasia procedure, but as the drugs start to head towards his bloodstream, he disconnects himself. Deciding he does not want to end his life, Rex drives back to Broken Hill, assisted by medication Julie provided. While Rex heads home with minimal rest, Tilly prepares to play in his first football game and Julie returns to England.

Arriving at his house, an exhausted Rex is greeted by Polly on his front porch. The two hold hands as Rex loses consciousness and watches the sun set.

Cast
 Michael Caton as Rex
 Ningali Lawford as Polly
 Mark Coles Smith as Tilly
 Emma Hamilton as Julie
 Jacki Weaver as Dr. Nicole Farmer

Additionally, Brian Taylor portrays the coach of Tilly's football club. Mercia Deane-Johns appears as Fay, a barmaid, and Brendan Cowell plays the publican of the tavern where Rex and Tilly encounter Julie.

Production
The script for the film was adapted as a screenplay by Jeremy Sims and Reg Cribb. Sims' association with Reg Cribb began when his production company, Pork Chop Productions produced a successful stage version. The film was given the go-ahead by Screen Australia in October 2013 as one of six films to share in $5.4 million government funding.

The shooting was scheduled to take place between May and June 2014.

Historical background
The play and film are modeled on the true story of Max Bell, a taxi driver from Broken Hill who made the 3000 kilometre trip from Broken Hill to Darwin in 1996 seeking euthanasia. Like Rex in the film, Bell also drove back to Broken Hill, but Bell did so reluctantly. He had been unable to obtain the signatures required to proceed with euthanasia in Darwin and died slowly in a hospital in Broken Hill, the fate he was trying to avoid.

The euthanasia device invented by the fictional Nicole Farmer in the film is based on Australian physician Philip Nitschke's Deliverance Machine, which was used legally in the Northern Territory while the Rights of the Terminally Ill Act was in effect.

Reception
Last Cab to Darwin received positive reviews from critics, earning a 89% approval rating on Rotten Tomatoes based on 35 reviews with an average rating of 7.1 out of 10. On Metacritic, the film holds a score of 70 based on nine reviews, indicating "generally favorable reviews".

Accolades

References

External links

2015 films
Australian comedy-drama films
Australian road movies
2010s English-language films
Films directed by Jeremy Sims